Adam Ptáček (born 8 October 1980 in Ostrava) is a Czech pole vaulter.

He won the bronze medal at the 1998 World Junior Championships, finished sixth at the 2002 European Championships and won the silver medal at the 2004 World Indoor Championships. He also competed at the 2003 World Championships and the 2004 Olympic Games without reaching the finals.

His personal best jump is 5.80 metres, achieved in July 2002 in Prague. Until 2015 it was the Czech record. In 2007 he jumped 5.82 in a city square contest, something which is not recognized by the IAAF.

References

External links

1980 births
Living people
Czech male pole vaulters
Athletes (track and field) at the 2004 Summer Olympics
Olympic athletes of the Czech Republic
Sportspeople from Ostrava